Norman James Crisp (11 December 1923 – 14 June 2005), known as a writer only by his initials and surname, N. J. Crisp, was a prolific British television writer, dramatist and novelist.

In the sixties after writing some single dramas, Crisp moved to writing for serials and turned out scripts for many BBC series including Compact, R3, Dixon of Dock Green, Dr Finlay's Casebook, Colditz and Secret Army.

In 1968, he co-created The Expert, a serial about a forensic scientist, with its producer Gerard Glaister. Four years later the pair repeated these roles with the boardroom drama The Brothers.

His 1996 play That Good Night starred Donald Sinden, Nigel Davenport, Lucy Fleming, Patrick Ryecart and Julie-Kate Olivier and was directed by Edward Hall. The film of the same title, based on Crisp's play, received its world premiere in June 2017 at the Edinburgh International Film Festival. It was John Hurt's final film, and was nominated for the Michael Powell Award for Best British Feature Film.

Crisp's 1987 psychological thriller Dangerous Obsession was filmed in 1999 as Darkness Falls, starring Ray Winstone, Tim Dutton and Sherilyn Fenn. However, Crisp was so appalled at the end result and how his famously intricate plot had been turned on its head without his permission that he insisted on having his name removed from the final print.

He was married to Marguerite (née Lowe), had three sons and one daughter and five grandchildren.

Writing credits

References
 Obituary: N. J. CRISP The Independent, 18 August 2005, by Anthony Hayward
 NJ Crisp The Stage, 19 July 2005 by Patrick Newley

External links
 

1923 births
2005 deaths
English television writers
Writers from Southampton
British male dramatists and playwrights
English male novelists
20th-century English novelists
20th-century English dramatists and playwrights
20th-century English male writers
British male television writers
20th-century English screenwriters